The Venice Baroque Orchestra is a baroque orchestra founded in 1997 by the Italian conductor and harpsichordist Andrea Marcon, based in Venice, Italy.

References

External links

Italian orchestras
Arts in Venice
Early music groups
Musical groups established in 1997